Kittson County is a county in the northwestern corner of the U.S. state of Minnesota along the Canada–US border, south of the Canadian province of Manitoba. As of the 2020 census, the population was 4,207. Its county seat is Hallock.

History
Evidence of occupation dating back 1800 years has been confirmed through archaeological expeditions done in the 1930s and 1970s around the burial mounds on the sand ridges in the eastern part of the county, which date to the Woodland Period. Evidence has been found that the Laurel, Arvilla, St. Croix, and Blackduck complexes were the area's early occupants. About 400 years ago, the Cree, Assiniboine, Sioux and Ojibway inhabited the county.

The early explorers of the region were fur traders. Pembina, North Dakota's oldest settlement, across the Red River from Kittson County, dates from 1797, when the first trading post was established by Charles Baptiste Chaboillez of the Northwest Fur Company. The Hudson Bay and American Fur Companies were also in Pembina as the fur trading industry increased. The fur traders and voyageurs traveled on the eastern side of the Red. Alexander Henry the younger, who erected a fort for the North West Company in Pembina, is thought to be the first white man to test agriculture in the valley. Joe Rolette, who started a fur post for the American Fur Company in Pembina, and Norman W. Kittson (for whom the county is named), were two early entrepreneurs who opened this area by developing the Red River Ox Cart trails and broadening the use of oxcarts. The need for oxcarts diminished as steamboats became the new mode for transporting furs and supplies. The railroad eventually replaced the steamboats.

Pembina County was one of five large counties the Minnesota Territory legislature established on October 27, 1849. It was not organized at that time. On March 9, 1878, the legislature renamed Pembina County Kittson County. On February 25, 1879, Kittson County was divided, creating Marshall County. The county seat, Hallock, was organized in 1880. Kittson County was further diminished in 1894 when Roseau County was partitioned off. Kittson County has retained its present boundaries since 1894.

St. Vincent, which is directly across the Red River from Pembina, was incorporated in 1857, just before statehood. In 1878, the St. Paul & Pacific Railroad line reached St. Vincent and opened the area to settlement. With the railroad coming through, settlers began arriving to stake their claims. Many of the earliest settlers in what became Pembina and St. Vincent were Métis, going back to the late 18th century. The railway extended through the western part of the county, with Donaldson, Kennedy, Hallock, Northcote, Humboldt and St. Vincent along the line. The eastern part of the county was settled in the early 1900s. The Soo Line railroad was completed in 1904 and the communities of Karlstad, Halma, Bronson, Lancaster, Orleans and Noyes were established. Scandinavians, Ukrainians, Polish, Scottish, Irish, English, Germans, French Canadians, Canadian Gaelic speakers from New Brunswick, and Métis all contributed to the county's melting pot.

Once home to over 10,000 people, the county population declined below 5,000 in 2006.

Historic sites
Three sites in the county are listed in the National Register of Historic Places: the St. Nicholas Orthodox Church, in Caribou Township; the burial mounds known as the "Lake Bronson Site", in Norway and Percy Townships; and the Lake Bronson State Park WPA/Rustic Style Historic Resources, which include an observation tower and several buildings. Lake Bronson State Park also has interpretive sites for the tower, a pioneer cemetery and the WPA camp.

Geography
Kittson County is in Minnesota's northwest corner, on the borders of North Dakota and Canada. The Red River flows north along the county's western border. The South Fork of Two Rivers flows east through the central part of the county on its way to discharge into the Red; it meets the Middle Fork at Hallock, and the combined flow meets the North Fork a few miles east of the Red. The Joe River flows northwest out of the county into Canada, to discharge into the Red a few miles past the international border.

The county's terrain consists of low rolling hills, devoted to agriculture. The terrain slopes to the north and west, with its highest point near the southeast corner at 1,079' (329m) ASL.

Kittson County was once part of glacial Lake Agassiz. Evidence of this prehistoric lake can still be seen in the county's topography. Remnants of McCauleyville Beach can be found in the eastern part of the county, an area of sandy soil and sand ridges. Other evidence of the glacier and Lake Agassiz is the approximately 140' drop in elevation from the eastern part of the county to the western part, near the Red River Valley, with its proliferation of black rich soil. Lake Bronson is a manmade reservoir, completed in 1937.

Major highways

  U.S. Highway 59
  U.S. Highway 75
  Minnesota State Highway 11
  Minnesota State Highway 171
  Minnesota State Highway 175
  Minnesota State Highway 220

Adjacent counties and rural municipalities

 Town of Emerson, Manitoba  (north)
 Rural Municipality of Franklin, Manitoba  (north)
 Rural Municipality of Stuartburn, Manitoba (north)
 Roseau County, Minnesota  (east)
 Marshall County, Minnesota  (south)
 Walsh County, North Dakota  (southwest)
 Pembina County, North Dakota  (west)

Protected areas
 Beaches State Wildlife Management Area
 Lake Bronson Parklands Scientific and Natural Area
 Lake Bronson State Park

Lakes
 Lake Bronson
 Lake Stella
 Twin Lakes

Demographics

2000 census
As of the 2000 census, there were 5,285 people, 2,167 households, and 1,447 families in the county. The population density was 4.81/sqmi (1.86/km2). There were 2,719 housing units at an average density of 2.47/sqmi (0.96/km2). The racial makeup of the county was 98.09% White, 0.15% Black or African American, 0.26% Native American, 0.25% Asian, 0.38% from other races, and 0.87% from two or more races.  1.27% of the population were Hispanic or Latino of any race. 30.1% were of Norwegian, 25.7% Swedish, 13.7% German and 6.6% Polish ancestry. Kittson County had the highest percentage of Swedish speakers of any county in the United States.

There were 2,167 households, of which 29.2% had children under age 18 living with them, 57.4% were married couples living together, 6.0% had a female householder with no husband present, and 33.2% were non-families. 30.5% of all households were made up of individuals, and 16.3% had someone living alone who was 65 or older. The average household size was 2.37 and the average family size was 2.96.

The county population contained 25.1% under age 18, 5.5% from 18 to 24, 23.7% from 25 to 44, 24.20% from 45 to 64, and 21.60% who were 65 or older. The median age was 42. For every 100 females there were 98.4 males. For every 100 females 18 and over, there were 98.6 males.

The median income for a household in the county was $32,515, and the median income for a family was $40,072. Males had a median income of $30,240 versus $21,320 for females. The per capita income for the county was $16,525. About 8.0% of families and 10.2% of the population were below the poverty line, including 11.3% of those under 18 and 10.4% of those 65 or older.

2020 Census

Communities

Cities

 Donaldson
 Hallock (county seat)
 Halma
 Humboldt
 Karlstad
 Kennedy
 Lake Bronson (named "Bronson" until 1939)
 Lancaster
 St. Vincent

Unincorporated communities

 Caribou
 Northcote
 Noyes
 Orleans
 Robbin

Ghost town
 Pelan

Townships

 Arveson Township
 Cannon Township
 Caribou Township
 Clow Township
 Davis Township
 Deerwood Township
 Granville Township
 Hallock Township
 Hampden Township
 Hazelton Township
 Hill Township
 Jupiter Township
 Norway Township
 Pelan Township
 Percy Township
 Poppleton Township
 Richardville Township
 St. Joseph Township
 St. Vincent Township
 Skane Township
 South Red River Township
 Spring Brook Township
 Svea Township
 Tegner Township
 Teien Township
 Thompson Township

Unorganized territories
 East Kittson
 McKinley
 North Red River

Politics
Kittson County has been a swing county for several decades, tending to vote Democratic. As of 2020, the county has selected the Democratic nominee in 60% of presidential elections since 1980.

See also
 National Register of Historic Places listings in Kittson County, Minnesota

References

1878 establishments in Minnesota
British-American culture in Minnesota
Canadian Gaelic
 
Minnesota counties
Populated places established in 1878
Scottish-American culture